The Tanzania Communications Regulatory Authority (TCRA), established by the TCRA Act No. 12 of 2003, is an independent Authority for the postal, broadcasting and electronic communications industries in the United Republic of Tanzania. It merged the former Tanzania Communications Commission and the Tanzania Broadcasting Commission. The TCRA is accountable to the Communications and Technology Ministry. The Information Communication and Technology (ICT) sector reform in Tanzania is notable in that development was influenced by regional, political (national) and technological factors.  Tanzania is one of the few African countries to liberalise the communications sector whereby the Converged Licensing Framework (CLF) is used as a key strategy, in terms of the Tanzania Communications Regulations. Since inception in 2003, the TCRA has issued a number of regulations to administer the sector, but still faces a number of challenges such as the roll-out of services to under-serviced rural areas.

Mandate and purpose

The TCRA’s mandate is to regulate the postal, electronic communications and broadcasting industries in the United Republic of Tanzania, which includes:
	promotion of effective competition and economic efficiency;
	protecting the interests of consumers;
	promoting the availability of regulated services
	licensing and enforcing licence conditions of broadcasting, postal and Telecommunications operators;
	establishing standards for regulated goods and services;
	regulating rates and charges (tariffs);
	managing the radio frequency spectrum;
	monitoring the performance of the regulated sectors; and
	monitoring the implementation of ICT applications.

The legislation that established the TCRA is the Tanzania Communications Regulatory Authority Act of 2003.  The primary legislation governing the industries regulated by the TCRA is the Universal Communications Service Access Act of 2006.

Policies that impact the functioning of the TCRA include:
	National ICT Policy of 2003  
	National Postal Policy of 2003

Regulations issued by TCRA

       Tanzania Communications (Quality of Service) Regulations of 2005  
	Tanzania Communications (Broadband Services) Regulations of 2005 
	Tanzania Communications (Consumer Protection) Regulations of 2005 
	Tanzania Broadcasting (Content) Regulations of 2005
	Tanzania Communications (Licensing) Regulations of 2005 
	Tanzania Communications (Importation and Distribution) Regulations of 2005 
	Tanzania Communications (Installation and Maintenance) Regulations of 2005 
	Tanzania Communications (Interconnection) Regulations of 2005 
	Tanzania Communications (Telecommunication Numbering and Electronic Address) Regulations of 2005 
	Tanzania Postal Regulations of 2005 
	Tanzania Communications (Radio Communications and Frequency Spectrum) Regulations of 2005 
	Tanzania Communications (Tariffs) Regulations of 2005
	Tanzania Communications (Type Approval of Electronic Communications Equipments) Regulations of 2005 
	Tanzania Communications (Access and Facilities) Regulations of 2005

History of the sector regulator and industry
The following history incorporates (i) regional and (ii) national developments in the sector and the establishment of the sector regulator.

Structure and functions

Duties
According to the establishing Act No. 12 of 2003, the duties of TCRA include the following:

 Promoting effective competition and economic efficiency;
 Protecting the interest of consumers;
 Protecting the financial viability of efficient suppliers;
 Promoting the availability of regulated services to all consumers including low income, rural and disadvantaged consumers;
 Enhancing public knowledge, awareness and understanding of the regulated sectors including:           i. The rights and obligations of consumers and regulated suppliers;          ii. The ways in which complaints and disputes may be initiated and resolved; and          iii. The duties, functions and activities of the Authority.
 Taking into account the need to protect and preserve the environment

Functions
The functions of TCRA according to its establishing Act No. 12 of 2003 (CAP .172) and the revision thereof (the Tanzania Communications Regulatory Authority Act, CAP .172 R.E. 2017) include, among others, the following

 To perform the functions conferred on the Authority by sector legislation, that is, to:         i. issue, renew and cancel licences;          ii. establish standards for regulated goods and regulated services;          iii. establish standards for the terms and conditions of supply of the regulated goods and services; and          iv. regulate rates and charges.          v. make rules for carrying out the purposes and provisions of this Act and the sector legislation;
 To monitor the performance of the regulated sectors in relation to:          i. Levels of investment;         ii. Availability, quality and standards of services;        iii. The cost of services;         iv. The efficiency of production and distribution of services, and          v. Other matters relevant to the Authority;
 To facilitate the resolution of complaints and disputes;
 To take over and continue carrying out the functions of formerly the Tanzania Communications Commission and Tanzania Broadcasting Commission;
 To disseminate information about matters relevant to the functions of the Authority; and
 To consult with other regulatory authorities or bodies or institutions discharging functions similar to those of the Authority in the United Republic of Tanzania and elsewhere.

On the other hand, the Electronic and Postal Communications Act No. 3 of 2010 – CAP. 306 and the revision thereof, (the Electronic and Postal Communications Act, CAP. 306 R.E. 2017) further provides the main functions of TCRA to include:

 Issuance of licenses and regulating electronic communications systems;
 Issuance of Postal Licenses and to regulating provision of Postal Services;
 Promoting fair competition and level play ground;
 Issuance of electronic communication numbering and addressing;
 Allocating, managing and regulating addresses and postcodes;
 Managing and assigning the national radio frequency spectrum;
 Establishing standards for technical equipment connected to a network;
 Establishing central equipment identification register;
 Establishing and maintaining subscribers’ database; and
 Regulating content related matters.

Board members
The TCRA board chairperson and vice chairperson are appointed by the president of Tanzania, pursuant to section 7 (2) of the Tanzania Communications Regulatory Authority (TCRA)  Act No. 12 under which TCRA was established.

In accordance with the provisions of clause 2.(2) of the First Schedule to the Tanzania Communications Regulatory Authority Act No. 12 of 2003, the minister of communications, science and technology, after submission by the nominations committee, and a competitive selection procedure as per Section 13 (6) of the TCRA Act, appoints the remaining members of the TCRA Board.

With these appointments, and in accordance with the provisions of Section 7 (1) of the Tanzania Communications Regulatory Authority Act No.12 of 2003, the seven members of the TCRA board are as follows:
	Dkt. Jones A. Killimbe - chairman
	Bw. Khalfan S. Saleh - vice chairman
	Bi. Vupe Ursula Ligate - member
	Dkt. Mzee Suleiman Mndewa - member
	Bw. Ndalahwa Habbi Gunze - member
	Dkt. George Mulamula - member

Highlights and controversies

	Communications in Tanzania have often been very unreliable in the past. The mobile telephone services are usually available only in urban areas, although there are currently efforts to provide nationwide mobile phone coverage. Competition in Tanzania's telecommunication sector is expected to get stiffer after the country's regulatory authority licensed four more cellular phone service providers to bring the number to ten.
	The TCRA has given mobile network operating licenses to five more companies, bringing the tally for the country to twelve. The country now has one of the highest ratios of licenses to potential customers in the world, although with a population penetration level of just 43%, there is space for new companies to grow. The five new entrants are MyCell, Egotel, Rural Netco, Smile and ExcellentCom. They are expected to enter the country's communication industry when the process to give them network facility licensees is completed," TCRA director-general John Nkoma told the Citizen newspaper.

	TCRA published several consultative documents:
	Consultation Document on Code of Ethics for Advertising and Sponsorship for Broadcasting Media.
	Consultation Document on the Introduction of a New Licence Category of Closed User Group Network.
	Public consultation document on Code of Practice for Community Broadcasting Services.

See also
 Media of Tanzania

References

External links
and Technology Ministry
Tanzania Communications Regulatory Authority (TCRA)
Tanzania ICT Service Providers

Communications in Tanzania
2003 establishments in Tanzania
Communications authorities
Regulation in Tanzania